Shemushack Noshahr (Shimushik Nushiher) is an Iranian football club based in Noshahr, Iran. They currently compete in the Iran Football's 3rd Division.

They currently play in the Azadegan League. The team has little talent or success, but is loved by those living in Noshahr, and games at its small stadium are always a sellout.
The team is one of the youngest in Iran and until three years ago was playing in the 2nd division. The team was relegated back into the Azadegan League, on April 16, 2006.

Season-by-season
The table below chronicles the achievements of Shamoushak Noshahr in various competitions since 1994.

Club managers
  Mokhtar Babaei  (2001–02)
  Akbar Misaghian (2002–04)
  Farshad Pious (2004–05)
  Bahman Foroutan (2005–07)
  Mohammad Ali Fallahdar (June 2007 – April 7)
  Bahman Foroutan (April 2007 – June 8)
  Baha Aldin Sanaee (June 2008 – October 9)
  Mokhtar Babaei (October 2009–)

Club honors
Azadegan League:
2003

References

Football clubs in Iran
Association football clubs established in 1994
Sport in Mazandaran Province
1994 establishments in Iran